The Shepperton to Weybridge Ferry is a pedestrian and cycle ferry service across the River Thames in Surrey, England. The service has operated almost continuously for over 500 years.

Connected communities and landmarks
The ferry runs from Shepperton on the north bank of the river to Weybridge on the south bank. It provides a crossing for the Thames Path, and is the only ferry on route of the path itself. Three public houses are within 300 metres of the ferry, two on the south bank and two of which focus on their restaurants, one of which is a listed building and was the home of the Dutch Ambassador.

Operation
The ferry operates from 0800 on weekdays, 0900 on Saturdays, and 1000 on Sundays. Service finishes at 1700 to 1730 in winter and 1800 in summer. Operation is on request and intending passengers should ring the bell provided on each side of the river. Tickets can be bought in the Ferry Coffee Shop or on the ferry itself.

The ferry has operated on different vessels for over 500 years discounting a 26-year-break before 1986.  Exceptional expense and a very low housing density in the immediate area prohibited a proposed replacement by a long, unsupported by piers, footbridge.  The river was made fully lock-controlled along these reaches.  Before 1815 Shepperton at its Lower Halliford neighbourhood was one of the first fording places of the Thames.

In film, fiction and the media
In fiction, the Shepperton to Weybridge Ferry is the scene of the first confrontation between the British military, six twelve-pound artillery pieces, and the Martians, five fighting-machines, that the protagonist witnesses in H. G. Wells' science fiction novel The War of the Worlds. A Martian is destroyed by a direct hit from an artillery shell, and its comrades use their heat rays to wreak vengeance on the fleeing crowds waiting to cross the ferry.

See also
Crossings of the River Thames

References

River Thames ferries
Transport in Surrey